The Growing Participator Approach (GPA) is an alternative paradigm for second language acquisition created by Greg Thomson. In GPA, the goal is not language acquisition, but participation in the life of a new community, which is constantly growing over time. Thus, GPA uses the terminology of a 'growing participator' instead of a language learner, and a 'nurturer' instead of a teacher. Theoretically, GPA draws upon Lev Vygotsky's Sociocultural Theory, especially as interpreted by James Wertsch. This includes in particular the mediated nature of human mental life, and the zone of proximal development, relabeled as the growth zone. A second influence is the psycholinguistic study of speech comprehension and production. A third influence is usage-based linguistics. Various areas related to linguistic anthropology (identity theory, politeness theory, discourse analysis, communities of practice, figured worlds, etc.) also play roles   In the language of pedagogy, GPA involves an approach, a method, and techniques.

Approach 
Thomson suggests three dimensions of language learning (or participation) which are important for GPA.

Sociocultural Dimension 
GPA  supports Michael Agar's effort to erase the circle scholars attempted to draw separating language and culture. Essentialization or reification of "culture "are also resisted. One of the GPA slogans is "We don't do language; we do people (and people talk [a lot])". Rather than "cultures" the GPA sees groups of people  joined by their shared practices. As those shared practices are mediated by tools and signs that differ greatly from group to group, they are referred to as "languacultural worlds". Thus, instead of viewing "language learning" as a private achievement of individual human brains, the goal is to enter and grow within a "host langucultural world,"  by appropriating more and more of its practices over time through participation in life with concrete host people.  Hence, GPA uses the terminology of "growing participators" rather than "language learners". Growing participation happens most effectively when host people interact with the growing participators within their growth zone (ZPD).

Cognitive Dimension 
Drawing on fields of psycholinguistics and usage-based grammar, and noting that good comprehension of English speech requires a listening vocabulary of over 10,000 words, GPA  emphasizes "massive comprehension vocabulary." However, instead of rote memorization, GPA advocates strong initial encounters with new words, followed by natural "strengthening encounters"  in new contexts that make them meaningful. The strengthening encounters will occur in line with the frequency of the words (local frequency by discourse, or global frequency). As new words are encountered and understood, their form is at first attached to the growing participator's home-world lexical concepts (fast mapping). Ultimately, the growing participator doesn't know words in a piecemeal way, but comes to understand them in connection with discourses in which they play a role, as the growing participator becomes party more and more to host-world discourses in which those words play a role (with situated meanings).   The development of a healthy mental (comprehension) lexicon will require "encountering a massive amount of understandable speech over a long period of time". Thus, GPA emphasizes comprehension and listening as the natural pathway toward speaking ability in the host language.  These principles apply not only to words, but to recurring word combinations and patterns of words. As noted, the bigger picture includes the socio-cultural processes that the cognitive processes reflect.

Temporal Dimension 
Where as many language programs emphasize quantity of time, GPA puts an additional emphasis on quality. "Host world time" is divided into "lifestyle growing participation time" (naturalistic immersion) and "Special growth participation time". In general, "Host world time" is time when the GP is interacting with host people using host words, and attempting to follow host behavior. GPA aims for 20 hours/week during which "people interact with me in my growth zone in their languacultural world." As a result, because a beginning growing participator's growth is so limited, early growth requires that a dedicated host person be recruited as a special nurturer.

"Language Acquisition" in GPA Terms 
Based on these three dimensions, GPA's approach can be summarised as follows:

Method 
The Six-Phase Program (SPP), created by Thomson, is "an idealised program to guide a growing participator into deep involvement with a community." It involves 1,500 hours of special-growth activities, assisted (initially) by a dedicated native speaker —a nurturer, who is most often not a career teacher. It is "structured in such a way that the activities become increasingly advanced as the user grows, and the activities are "keyed to the sociocultural/human-relationship changes and cognitive changes that the growing participator (GP) undergoes."

Overview of the Six-Phase Program

Techniques 
GPA and the SPP utilise a wide array of techniques, such as TPR activities (in silence for the first 30-40 hrs), back and forth storytelling, wordless picture books, discussing speech acts with the use of resources such as Lexicarry, input/output flooding, ethnographic interviews, and extensive recording and playback for revision.

References 

Language acquisition